Memories is a 2013 Indian Malayalam-language slasher crime thriller film written and directed by Jeethu Joseph, starring Prithviraj Sukumaran, S. P. Sreekumar, Vijayaraghavan, Meghana Raj, Miya George, Suresh Krishna and Rahul Madhav.  The film is produced by P. K. Muralidharan and Santha Murali under the banner of Anantha Visions. The film follows Sam Alex (Prithviraj), a drunkard cop, who is forced to investigate a series of murders. The film was released on 9th August 2013 and was critically acclaimed by the critics and was a commercial success at the box office. 

The film received a cult status and is regarded as one of the best finest and most intellectually entertaining crime thrillers in Mollywood, where it was remade in Tamil in 2016 as Aarathu Sinam.

Plot
Sam Alex is a SP of Kerala Police, who is heavily dependent on alcohol to ease the loss of his family. Sam was a peaceful family guy, leading a good life with his family. His loving wife Teena and beloved daughter were murdered by his enemy right in front of his eyes. He kills him and as a result, turns into an alcoholic. Sam's supervisor Aravindhaksha Menon requests him to proceed with a parallel investigation in a case involving the disappearance and possible kidnapping of several young married men, since the present police team is not able to make any progress in the case. 

Sam refuses to this. Later, his mother Marykutty requests him to take up the investigation. Sam soon gets into the case files and consults the post-mortem documents and the doctors who conducted it. Soon, Sam is seen making a breakthrough in the case. Another two kidnappings happen, and all this leads to Sam's rough conclusion of the killer. The killer is an eccentric person, who has a limp in his feet, and either hates or loves women. The killer leaves certain clues inscribed by a sharp surgical knife on the chest of the victims. 

This serves Sam's thinking of what kind of person the killer is and who is his next target. Upon careful examination of the words inscribed in the body of the victims, Sam uncovers that the words are actually Aramaic, the language Jesus used for communication. The words are later found to point to biblical proverbs, thus helping Sam lead to conclusions that the killer is insane and assumed the victims gave up their lives for the sins committed by their respective wives. He soon figures out that the wives of the kidnapped husbands have links with a guy named Anand (who now goes by the name Peter), who studied with them certain years back, but there was no evidence of such a person.

After this, Sam realizes that there is one last target and Peter will not miss and will disappear after that. He eventually finds out that the next target is his own brother Sanju, and his brother's wife is the last link in the connection. Sam finds out with the help of his colleague and other evidence that Peter has a property near Kottayam. He goes there for one last confrontation. After killing Peter, Sam gives up drinking, where he finally moves on and adopts the daughter of Peter's sister.

Cast

Release
Memories was released on 9 August 2013.

The film had been remade into Tamil as Aarathu Sinam with Arulnithi in lead.

Reception
Sify.com rated the film as "Good", stating that "Memories is an engaging film that has been well made." Gayathry of Oneindia.in says that "Memories is undoubtedly an  entertaining investigation movie." Aswin of The Times of India says that "Memories is an engaging watch, courtesy a good plot and a cast that does justice to the plot." Indiaglitz.com says that "Memories is a thriller which may find space among the list of well crafted suspense thrillers in Mollywood.  Nowrunning.com rated the film as "Above Average", stating that "Memories is a decent entertainer and stunning triller in which plot twists abound, and the ambiance is laced with intrigue."

Music

Accolades 
 Won the Kerala State Film Awards in 2014 for Best Cinematography. Memories - IMDb
 Won the Asianet Film Awards in 2014 for Most popular actor.

References

External links
 

2013 films
2010s Malayalam-language films
Indian detective films
2010s mystery thriller films
2013 crime thriller films
Films directed by Jeethu Joseph
Malayalam films remade in other languages
Indian mystery thriller films
Fictional portrayals of the Kerala Police
2010s police procedural films
2010s serial killer films
Indian serial killer films
Indian films about revenge
Films about murder
Films about murderers
Films set in Kerala
Indian crime thriller films
Indian nonlinear narrative films